Bransfield is a surname. Notable people with the surname include:

Edward Bransfield ( 1785–1852), Irish sailor and naval officer
Kitty Bransfield (1875–1947), American baseball player
Marjorie Bransfield, American actress
Michael J. Bransfield (born 1943), American Catholic clergyman